Flashpoint Music is an independent production house and record label based in Australia specialising in rock and pop.  Flashpoint Records and Flashpoint Music Publishing are associated companies.

History
Formed when songwriter / producer Harry Vanda left Albert Productions after a 27-year association, and teamed up with son Daniel Vandenberg to build a recording complex in Surry Hills, Sydney. One of the first projects brought to them was by Nic Cester of Jet who had formed the Australian supergroup The Wrights in 2004.  The project resulted in a re-make of the 11 minute mid-70s hit for Stevie Wright, "Evie Parts 1, 2 & 3" which peaked in the Australian ARIAnet singles chart at #2 in March 2005.  Later that year Harry and Daniel teamed up with David Hasselhoff, recording and producing the #3 UK Singles Chart hit "Jump In My Car".

Other projects include British India whose debut album Guillotine was nominated for Triple J's J Award in 2007. In December of that year British India won the AIR Award for 'Best New Independent Artist' and finished off the year with two entries in Triple J's Hottest 100, 2007.  In July 2008 the band released their second album Thieves which entered the ARIAnet Albums chart at #5.

Selected albums produced or co-produced by Harry Vanda 

 Vigil - Easybeats
 Friends - Easybeats
 Hard Road - Stevie Wright
 High Voltage - AC/DC
 Black-Eyed Bruiser - Stevie Wright
 T.N.T. - AC/DC
 Dirty Deeds Done Dirt Cheap - AC/DC
 Let There Be Rock - AC/DC
 The Angels - The Angels
 Love Is In The Air - John Paul Young
 Powerage - AC/DC
 Flash and the Pan - Flash and the Pan
 Rose Tattoo - Rose Tattoo
 If You Want Blood You've Got It - AC/DC
 Lights in the Night - Flash and the Pan
 Rock And Roll Women - Cheetah
 Assault & Battery - Rose Tattoo
 Headlines - Flash and the Pan
 Scarred For Life - Rose Tattoo
 Early Morning Wake Up Call - Flash and the Pan
 Who Made Who - AC/DC
 Blow Up Your Video - AC/DC
 Mark Williams ZNZ - Mark Williams
 Guillotine - British India
 Thieves - British India

Sources 
 The Encyclopedia of Australian Rock and Pop - Ian McFarlane - Allen & Unwin, Sydney - 1999
 Who's Who In Australia 2006 XLII Edition - Crown Content, Melbourne
 Evie cd single liner notes

See also
 List of record labels

References

External links
 Flashpoint Music's official website
 Flashpoint's MySpace
 Official British India MySpace

Australian independent record labels
Rock record labels